Anker Kihle  (19 April 1917 – 1 February 2000) was a Norwegian football goalkeeper who played for Norway in the 1938 FIFA World Cup. He was capped twice. He also played for Storm.

References

External links
 
 
 

1917 births
2000 deaths
Norwegian footballers
Norway international footballers
Association football goalkeepers
1938 FIFA World Cup players
Sportspeople from Skien